Giustiniano Marucco (22 August 1899 – 24 October 1942) was an Italian footballer who played as a forward. He competed for Italy in the men's football tournament at the 1920 Summer Olympics.

References

External links
 

1899 births
1942 deaths
Italian footballers
Italy international footballers
Olympic footballers of Italy
Footballers at the 1920 Summer Olympics
Footballers from Piedmont
Association football forwards
Novara F.C. players
Juventus F.C. players
Road incident deaths in Italy